Greg Eklund (born April 18, 1970) is an American musician/drummer. Originally, he was the drummer for Jolly Mon and quit the band after the release of their debut album. He then joined the rock band Everclear as their drummer from 1994-2003, The Oohlas from 2004-2008, and Storm Large and Le Bonheur 2009–present.

Eklund attended high school at Lake Braddock Secondary School in Burke, Virginia, graduating in 1988. There he played drums with several bands including The Blonde Mexicans, Tension (with Erik Wenberg from emmet swimming), and Red October (with Tom Goodin, future guitarist and founding member of the Pietasters on guitar).

After leaving the band, Jolly Mon, he replaced the original Everclear drummer Scott Cuthbert in 1994. With Everclear, Eklund wrote and sang "The Honeymoon Song" on the album Songs from an American Movie Vol. One: Learning How to Smile.

Eklund is currently the drummer for Storm Large and Le Bonheur who tours both nationally and internationally.  He has been married to artist Ellina Kevorkian since 1997. They have two children.

References 

1970 births
Living people
American rock drummers
Everclear (band) members
Musicians from Jacksonville, Florida
20th-century American drummers
American male drummers
21st-century American drummers